In the history of France, the First Republic, sometimes referred to in historiography as Revolutionary France, and officially the French Republic, was founded on 21 September 1792 during the French Revolution. The First Republic lasted until the declaration of the First Empire on 18 May 1804 under Napoléon Bonaparte, although the form of the government changed several times.

This period was characterized by the downfall and abolition of the French monarchy, the establishment of the National Convention and the Reign of Terror, the Thermidorian Reaction and the founding of the Directory, and, finally, the creation of the Consulate and Napoleon's rise to power.

End of the monarchy in France

Under the Legislative Assembly, which was in power before the proclamation of the First Republic, France was engaged in war with Prussia and Austria. In July 1792, the Duke of Brunswick, commanding general of the Austro–Prussian Army, issued his Brunswick Manifesto, threatening the destruction of Paris should any harm come to King Louis XVI of France.

This foreign threat exacerbated France's political turmoil amid the French Revolution and deepened the passion and sense of urgency among the various factions. In the insurrection of 10 August 1792, citizens rioted the Tuileries Palace, killing six hundred of the King's Swiss guards and insisting on the removal of the king.

A renewed fear of anti-revolutionary action prompted further violence, and in the first week of September 1792, mobs of Parisians broke into the city's prisons. They killed over half of the prisoners, including nobles, clergymen, and political prisoners, but also common criminals, such as prostitutes and petty thieves.  Many victims were murdered in their cells: raped, stabbed, and/or slashed to death. This became known as the September Massacres.

National Convention (1792-1795)

As a result of the spike in public violence and the political instability of the constitutional monarchy, a party of six members of France's Legislative Assembly was assigned the task of overseeing elections. The resulting Convention was founded with the dual purpose of abolishing the monarchy and drafting a new constitution.

The convention's first act was to establish the French First Republic and officially strip the king of all political powers. Louis XVI, by then a private citizen bearing his family name of Capet, was subsequently put on trial for crimes of high treason starting in December 1792. On 16 January 1793 he was convicted, and on 21 January, he was executed.

Throughout the winter of 1792 and spring of 1793, Paris was plagued by food riots and mass hunger. The new Convention did little to remedy the problem until late spring of 1793, occupied instead with matters of war. Finally, on 6 April 1793, the Convention created the Committee of Public Safety, and was given a monumental task: "To deal with the radical movements of the Enragés, food shortages and riots, the revolt in the Vendée and in Brittany, recent defeats of its armies, and the desertion of its commanding general."

Most notably, the Committee of Public Safety instated a policy of terror, and the guillotine began to fall on perceived enemies of the republic at an ever-increasing rate, beginning the period known today as the Reign of Terror.

Despite growing discontent with the National Convention as a ruling body, in June the Convention drafted the Constitution of 1793, which was ratified by popular vote in early August. However, the Committee of Public Safety was seen as an "emergency" government, and the rights guaranteed by the 1789 Declaration of the Rights of Man and of the Citizen and the new constitution were suspended under its control.

The constitution of the republic did not provide for a formal head of state or a head of government.
It could be discussed whether the head of state would have been the president of the National Assembly under international law. However, this changed every two weeks and was therefore not formative.

Directory (1795-1799)

After the arrest and execution of Robespierre on 28 July 1794, the Jacobin club was closed, and the surviving Girondins were reinstated. A year later, the National Convention adopted the Constitution of the Year III. They reestablished freedom of worship, began releasing large numbers of prisoners, and most importantly, initiated elections for a new legislative body.

On 3 November 1795, the Directory was established. Under this system, France was led by a bicameral Parliament, consisting of an upper chamber called the Council of Elders (with 250 members) and a lower chamber called the Council of Five Hundred (with, accordingly, 500 members), and a collective Executive of five members called the Directory (from which the historical period gets its name). Due to internal instability, caused by hyperinflation of the paper monies called Assignats, and French military disasters in 1798 and 1799, the Directory lasted only four years, until overthrown in 1799.

Consulate (1799-1804)

The French Consulate era began with the coup of 18 Brumaire on 9 November 1799. Members of the Directory itself planned the coup, indicating clearly the failing power of the Directory. Napoleon Bonaparte was a co-conspirator in the coup, and became head of the government as the First Consul. 

On 18 May 1804, Napoleon was proclaimed Emperor of the French by the Sénat conservateur. He would later proclaim himself Emperor of the French, ending the First French Republic and ushering in the French First Empire.

See also

French Republican Calendar
French Revolutionary Wars
Guillotine
French Second Republic
French Third Republic
French Fourth Republic
French Fifth Republic

References

Bibliography 

 
French Republic 1
French Republic 1
Modern history of France

Republic 1
Republic 1
Republicanism in France
French Revolution
1792 establishments in France
1804 disestablishments in France
States and territories established in 1792
States and territories disestablished in 1804
19th century in France